Naarda nodariodes is a species of moth in the family Erebidae first described by Prout in 1928. It is known from Borneo.

References

Herminiinae
Moths described in 1928